William Douglas Guthrie (born January 17, 1967) is an American former professional boxer.

Early life
Prior to fighting,  Guthrie was an admitted former player in the St Louis drugs scene, and he had been kicked off the 1988 US Olympic team after failing a drug test.  He also later spent time in prison for drug possession.

Amateur career
Guthrie was the 1985 National Golden Gloves middleweight champion.

Professional career
Guthrie turned pro in 1989 and captured the Vacant IBF Light Heavyweight Title in 1997 with a win over Darrin Allen. He was seen as a looming threat to Roy Jones Jr. at light heavyweight due to his punching power, but instead of a unification bout, he lost the title in his next fight to Reggie Johnson by a knockout in the 5th. The knockout was a brutal one, and Guthrie left the ring on a stretcher . Instead of retiring, he instead moved up to cruiserweight and continued to fight, but has not fought for a belt since.

Professional boxing record

|-
|align="center" colspan=8|35 Wins (28 knockouts, 7 decisions), 4 Losses (3 knockouts, 1 decision), 3 Draws 
|-
| align="center" style="border-style: none none solid solid; background: #e3e3e3"|Result
| align="center" style="border-style: none none solid solid; background: #e3e3e3"|Record
| align="center" style="border-style: none none solid solid; background: #e3e3e3"|Opponent
| align="center" style="border-style: none none solid solid; background: #e3e3e3"|Type
| align="center" style="border-style: none none solid solid; background: #e3e3e3"|Round
| align="center" style="border-style: none none solid solid; background: #e3e3e3"|Date
| align="center" style="border-style: none none solid solid; background: #e3e3e3"|Location
| align="center" style="border-style: none none solid solid; background: #e3e3e3"|Notes
|-align=center
|Draw
|
|align=left| "King" James Johnson
|PTS
|6
|12/05/2007
|align=left| Patriot Center, Fairfax, Virginia
|align=left|
|-
|Loss
|
|align=left| Marlon Hayes
|UD
|12
|26/01/2007
|align=left| Destiny's, Orlando, Florida
|align=left|
|-
|Win
|
|align=left| Donnell Wiggins
|TKO
|4
|09/12/2006
|align=left| Florence County Fairgrounds, Florence, South Carolina
|align=left|
|-
|Win
|
|align=left| Luke Munsen
|TKO
|5
|29/07/2006
|align=left| Qwest Arena, Boise, Idaho
|align=left|
|-
|Win
|
|align=left| Carlos Bates
|TKO
|1
|27/05/2006
|align=left| The Plex, North Charleston, South Carolina
|align=left|
|-
|Win
|
|align=left| Eric Starr
|TKO
|5
|29/04/2006
|align=left| Greensboro Coliseum Complex, Greensboro, North Carolina
|align=left|
|-
|Win
|
|align=left| Vincent "Bones" Harris
|MD
|4
|31/03/2006
|align=left| Multi Fight Complex, Tampa, Florida
|align=left|
|-
|Draw
|
|align=left| Rodney "Road Warrior" Moore
|PTS
|6
|03/12/2005
|align=left| Saint Petersburg Municipal Coliseum, Saint Petersburg, Florida
|align=left|
|-
|Win
|
|align=left| Preston Kenney
|KO
|1
|02/06/2005
|align=left| Family Arena, Saint Charles, Missouri
|align=left|
|-
|Win
|
|align=left| John Romans William
|KO
|2
|27/11/2004
|align=left| Louisville Gardens, Louisville, Kentucky
|align=left|
|-
|Draw
|
|align=left| Hilario Guzman
|PTS
|6
|24/09/2004
|align=left| Philips Arena, Atlanta, Georgia
|align=left|
|-
|Loss
|
|align=left| Ravea Springs
|TKO
|11
|07/02/2002
|align=left| Adam's Mark, Saint Louis, Missouri
|align=left|
|-
|Win
|
|align=left| Terry Porter
|UD
|8
|25/09/2001
|align=left| The Ambassador, Saint Louis, Missouri
|align=left|
|-
|Win
|
|align=left| Lorenzo Boyd
|TKO
|2
|24/07/2001
|align=left| The Ambassador, Saint Louis, Missouri
|align=left|
|-
|Win
|
|align=left| John Kiser
|SD
|8
|06/05/2000
|align=left| Pan American Center, Las Cruces, New Mexico
|align=left|
|-
|Win
|
|align=left| Wesley Martin
|UD
|8
|11/03/2000
|align=left| Dade Community College, Miami, Florida
|align=left|
|-
|Loss
|
|align=left| Michael Nunn
|TKO
|7
|09/05/1999
|align=left| Minot Municipal Auditorium, Minot, North Dakota
|align=left|
|-
|Loss
|
|align=left| "Sweet" Reggie Johnson
|KO
|5
|06/02/1998
|align=left| Mohegan Sun, Uncasville, Connecticut
|align=left|
|-
|Win
|
|align=left| Darrin Allen
|TKO
|3
|19/07/1997
|align=left| Fantasy Springs Resort Casino, Indio, California
|align=left|
|-
|Win
|
|align=left| Jamie Stevenson
|KO
|3
|28/03/1997
|align=left| The Roxy, Boston, Massachusetts
|align=left|
|-
|Win
|
|align=left| Ramzi Hassan
|TKO
|6
|29/06/1996
|align=left| Fantasy Springs Resort Casino, Indio, California
|align=left|
|-
|Win
|
|align=left| John Kiser
|UD
|8
|18/05/1996
|align=left| The Mirage, Las Vegas, Nevada
|align=left|
|-
|Win
|
|align=left| Jerome Hill
|TKO
|2
|24/02/1996
|align=left| Richmond Coliseum, Richmond, Virginia
|align=left|
|-
|Win
|
|align=left| Tim Hillie
|SD
|10
|27/01/1996
|align=left| Arizona Veterans Memorial Coliseum, Phoenix, Arizona
|align=left|
|-
|Win
|
|align=left| Richard Frazier
|KO
|4
|08/11/1995
|align=left| 69th Regiment Armory, New York City
|align=left|
|-
|Win
|
|align=left| Jeff Bowman
|TKO
|3
|03/10/1995
|align=left| Memphis, Tennessee
|align=left|
|-
|Win
|
|align=left| Ron Butler
|TKO
|3
|25/04/1995
|align=left| Youth Center, Cut Off, Louisiana
|align=left|
|-
|Win
|
|align=left| Travis Meat
|KO
|1
|06/02/1995
|align=left| Henry VIII Hotel, Bridgeton, Missouri
|align=left|
|-
|Win
|
|align=left| Donnie Penelton
|KO
|2
|28/11/1994
|align=left| Henry VIII Hotel, Bridgeton, Missouri
|align=left|
|-
|Win
|
|align=left| Darrell Kizer
|TKO
|2
|23/06/1994
|align=left| Florissant, Missouri
|align=left|
|-
|Win
|
|align=left| Krishna Wainwright
|TKO
|6
|05/05/1994
|align=left| Las Vegas, Nevada
|align=left|
|-
|Win
|
|align=left| Jimmy Bills
|KO
|3
|11/04/1994
|align=left| Great Western Forum, Inglewood, California
|align=left|
|-
|Win
|
|align=left| Tim Knight
|PTS
|10
|27/08/1993
|align=left| Saint Louis, Missouri
|align=left|
|-
|Win
|
|align=left| Anthony Campbell
|KO
|2
|06/05/1993
|align=left| Saint Louis, Missouri
|align=left|
|-
|Win
|
|align=left| Eric Mustafa Cole
|TKO
|1
|28/07/1990
|align=left| Trump Castle, Atlantic City, New Jersey
|align=left|
|-
|Win
|
|align=left|David Gwynn
|KO
|1
|27/04/1990
|align=left| State Fair Arena, Mobile, Alabama
|align=left|
|-
|Win
|
|align=left| Lee Smith
|KO
|1
|24/03/1990
|align=left| State Fair Arena, Mobile, Alabama
|align=left|
|-
|Win
|
|align=left| Randy Thomas
|TKO
|1
|16/02/1990
|align=left| Clarion Hotel Ballroom, Saint Louis, Missouri
|align=left|
|-
|Win
|
|align=left| Chris Collins
|TKO
|3
|03/11/1989
|align=left| The Sands, Atlantic City, New Jersey
|align=left|
|-
|Win
|
|align=left| Roy Bedwell
|TKO
|1
|27/07/1989
|align=left| Chase Hotel, Saint Louis, Missouri
|align=left|
|-
|Win
|
|align=left| Clarence Hutchinson
|TKO
|1
|21/06/1989
|align=left| Whitey Herzog's Restaurant and Powerhouse Nightclub, Saint Louis, Missouri
|align=left|
|-
|Win
|
|align=left| "Papa" John Moore
|TKO
|2
|01/05/1989
|align=left| Omni International Hotel, Saint Louis, Missouri
|align=left|
|}

See also
 List of IBF world champions

External links

References
 Personal Background

1967 births
International Boxing Federation champions
Living people
Boxers from Philadelphia
American male boxers
Cruiserweight boxers
World light-heavyweight boxing champions